Totally Jodie Marsh: Who'll Take Her Up the Aisle? was a British reality television show, which saw glamour model Jodie Marsh audition a potential husband in London, Edinburgh, Sheffield, Birmingham, Cardiff and Bournemouth. The nine-part series, part of MTV's Totally strand, began on Sunday 22 July 2007 and culminated with Jodie marrying her 'Mr Right', Matt Peacock, on MTV One in September.

During an interview for Star Magazine, Jodie stated that as a businesswoman, she was doing this for the money as well as confiding that all her friends are getting married and having kids and she needs a husband.

The auditions themselves were not successful, as they drew fewer people than expected. From the beginning of the series, ratings dropped rapidly, and as a result MTV One screened a double bill for episodes 4 and 5. Details of her marriage and venue were revealed before the show was halfway complete.

Marsh married former-boyfriend-of-Katie Price's Matt Peacock on 1 September 2007 at Sugar Hut, a nightclub in Essex. Another wedding ceremony was shown on MTV One on 2 September 2007 in her mum's back garden on Sunday.

The couple split up after three months.

References

External links
Totally Jodie Marsh at MTV.co.uk

MTV original programming
British dating and relationship reality television series